McKeen is a surname. Notable people with the surname include:

Allyn McKeen, American football player and coach
Angus McKeen, Irish rugby union player
Bob McKeen (1933–1999), American basketball player
Charles McKeen, Canadian politician
H. Boyd McKeen, Union Army officer
Jock McKeen, Canadian physician
John Elmer McKeen, American chief executive
Joseph McKeen, American educator
Nery McKeen, Cuban middle distance runner
Robert McKeen, New Zealand politician
Stan McKeen, Canadian rugby union player
Stanley McKeen, Canadian politician
William McKeen, American academic
William R. McKeen Jr., inventor of the track motorcar and businessman

See also
McKean (surname)
McKeon